Guyana participated at the 2018 Summer Youth Olympics in Buenos Aires, Argentina from 6 October to 18 October 2018.

Athletics

Swimming

References

2018 in Guyanese sport
Nations at the 2018 Summer Youth Olympics
Guyana at the Youth Olympics